Philippe Gasparini (born 23 January 1969) is a French yacht racer who competed in the 2000 Summer Olympics.

References

1969 births
Living people
French male sailors (sport)
Olympic sailors of France
Sailors at the 2000 Summer Olympics – 49er
Place of birth missing (living people)